The Red Sleeve is a South Korean television series starring Lee Jun-ho, Lee Se-young, and Kang Hoon. It aired from November 12, 2021, to January 1, 2022, on MBC's newly established Fridays and Saturdays at 22:00 (KST) time slot.

Synopsis
Based on a novel of the same name, The Red Sleeve tells the record of a royal court romance between the King of Joseon who believes his duty is to his country first above love, and a court lady who wants to protect the life she has chosen.

Cast

Main
 Lee Jun-ho as Yi San, later King Jeongjo: the arrogant and perfectionist grandson of King Yeongjo. He constantly strives to become a benevolent King, but his father's death has left an emotional trauma in his heart.
 Lee Joo-won as young Yi San
 Lee Se-young as Seong Deok-im, later Royal Noble Consort Ui-bin Seong: a court lady who wants to live the life of her choice, rather than just be one of the numerous court ladies called "the King's women".
 Lee Seol-ah as young Seong Deok-im
 Kang Hoon as Hong Deok-ro: the Crown Prince's teacher who hides a cold personality beneath his warm-hearted appearance.
 Choi Jeong-hoo as young Hong Deok-ro

Supporting

Royal family
 Lee Deok-hwa as King Yeongjo
 Jang Hee-jin as Queen Jeongsun
 Kang Mal-geum as Hong Hye-bin, later Lady Hyegyeong
 Kim I-on as Princess Cheongyeon
 Jo Seung-hee as Princess Cheongseon
 Go Ha as Royal Consort Suk-ui Moon
 Park Seo-kyung as Hong Dan, later Royal Noble Consort Won-bin Hong

Court ladies
 Park Ji-young as Head Court Lady Jo
 Ji Eun as Kang Wol-hye
 Cha Mi-kyung as Court Lady Park

People around Yi San
 Oh Dae-hwan as Kang Tae-ho
 Moon Jeong-dae as Seo Gye-jung
  as Jung Jae-hwa
 Kim Kang-min as Kim Du-seong
 Yoon Hyo-sik as Yi San's head eunuch

People around Seong Deok-im
 Jang Hye-jin as Court Lady Seo
 Lee Min-ji as Kim Bok-yeon
 Yoon Hae-bin as young Kim Bok-yeon
  as Bae Kyung-hee
 Lee Seo-hyun as young Bae Kyung-hee
 Lee Eun-saem as Son Young-hee
 Jo Si-yeon as young Son Young-hee
 Yang Byung-yeol as Seong Sik

Yi San's political opponents
 Jo Hee-bong as Hong Jung-yeo
 Seo Hyo-rim as Princess Hwawan
 Kwon Hyun-bin as Jeong Baek-ik

Extended
  as Yi San's guard warrior
 Kim Ja-young as Court Lady Kwon
 Kim Byung-chun as Shim Hwi-won
 Yi Seo as Royal Noble Consort Hwa-bin Yun

Special appearances
 Ha Seok-jin as a magistrate
 Do Sang-woo as Crown Prince Sado
 Nam Gi-ae as Royal Noble Consort Yeong-bin Yi
 Lee Soon-jae as an elderly citizen

Production and release
The lead roles were initially offered to Kim Kyung-nam and Park Hye-su. The first script reading of the cast was held in May 2021.

The series was originally scheduled to premiere on November 5, 2021, but it was delayed by a week due to program adjustment for the broadcast of a professional baseball game.

On December 9, 2021, it was announced that the series would be extended by one episode due to its popularity and would end with 17 episodes. Due to the extension, episode 13 aired on December 24, while episodes 14 and 15 aired on December 25.

It was reported that filming started in May 2021 and continued filming for about seven months until December 21. It was mainly conducted at Mungyeong Saejae Open Set, Jeonju Hanok Village, Gwanghallu Garden in Namwon, Naganeupseong Folk Village, Yeokrin Set in Damyang County, and Yeolhwajeong Pavilion—located in Ganggol Village, Deungnyang-myeon, Boseong County.

Original soundtrack

Part 1

Part 2

Part 3

Part 4

Part 5

Part 6

Part 7

Part 8

Part 9

Viewership

Awards and nominations

Notes

References

External links
  
 
 
 

Korean-language television shows
MBC TV television dramas
South Korean romance television series
South Korean historical television series
Television series set in the Joseon dynasty
Television shows based on South Korean novels
2021 South Korean television series debuts
2022 South Korean television series endings